KLFX (107.3 FM, branded as "107.3 The Fox") is a radio station broadcasting an active rock format. Licensed to Nolanville, Texas, United States, the station serves the Killeen-Temple area.  The station is currently owned by iHeartMedia, Inc. and features programming from Westwood One.    The station's studios are located in Harker Heights, and its transmitter is located in Nolanville.

History
The station went on the air as KLFX on March 27, 1995. The facility was issued an initial construction permit on February 22, 1993 and assigned the callsign KKFF on March 29, 1993. Prior to sign-on, the callsign was changed to the current KLFX on November 1, 1994. The station airs much of the same playlist and specialty programming as sister station 102.5 KBRQ in Waco, typically in simulcast, but running its own imaging and commercial load specific to the Temple-Killeen-Fort Hood market.

References

External links

LFX
Active rock radio stations in the United States
IHeartMedia radio stations